The Best of Alison Moyet is a compilation album by British singer-songwriter Alison Moyet, released in 2009. Moyet's first compilation album since 2001's The Essential, The Best of contains twenty tracks, with selections from her seven solo albums.

In addition to the standard edition, a limited edition, two-disc The Best of – 25 Years Revisited version was also released, which features a selection of eleven songs re-interpreted and recorded live.

The album peaked at No. 17 in the UK, remaining in the Top 100 for thirteen weeks. Moyet supported the release with the 25 Years Revisited tour, which spanned 26 venues across the UK and Ireland during November–December 2009.

Critical reception

James Christopher Monger of AllMusic commented: "The remasters sounds exceptional, and nearly all of her most notable singles are here, but listeners just looking for the Yaz classic "Don't Go" would be better off with 2003's Essential compilation, as it contains the best of both worlds."

Track listing

Personnel
 Mazen Murad – remastering
 Geoff Pesche – remastering (Disc 2 of 25 Years Revisited only)
 Nicole Nodland – cover photo
 Steve Stacey – sleeve design
 Andy Hayes – album design, layout

Charts

References

External links
Alison Moyet's official website

Alison Moyet albums
2009 compilation albums
Sony Music compilation albums